Emīls is a Latvian masculine given name and may refer to:
Emīls Dārziņš (1875–1910), Latvian composer, conductor and music critic
Emīls Ģēģeris (born 1999), Latvian ice hockey player
Emīls Liepiņš (born 1992), Latvian cyclist 
Emīls Urbāns (fl. 1920s), Latvian footballer

References

Masculine given names
Latvian masculine given names